Tomas Clifford Arana (born April 3, 1955) is an American actor. He is best known for his roles in the films The Hunt for Red October (1990), The Bodyguard (1992), L.A. Confidential (1997), Gladiator (2000), The Bourne Supremacy (2004), Limitless (2011) and The Dark Knight Rises (2012).

Career
Arana has played leading and supporting roles in over 30 European productions including films by directors Lina Wertmüller, Liliana Cavani, Carlo Verdone and Michele Soavi, and with the Japanese director Koreyoshi Kurahara in the Toho production See You. He appeared as Quintus in Ridley Scott's Gladiator, Michael Bruening in Curtis Hanson's L.A. Confidential and in the second film of the Bourne series, The Bourne Supremacy. In theatre, Arana was the producer and a leading actor in the theatre company Falso Movimento, based in Naples, Italy. Under Arana and artistic director Mario Martone (now an Italian film director), Falso Movimento won many awards including Best Play of the Year and Best Set Design, as well as the Mondello Prize.

Arana also played the GRU sleeper agent Loginov in the 1990 film adaptation of Tom Clancy's novel The Hunt for Red October, the would-be killer in 1992's The Bodyguard starring Kevin Costner and Whitney Houston, a Belarusian resistance leader in Edward Zwick's 2008 film Defiance, and The Man In The Tan Coat in 2011's Limitless alongside Bradley Cooper and Robert De Niro. He appeared in the third installment of Christopher Nolan's Batman trilogy, The Dark Knight Rises, as Bruce Wayne's lawyer. In 2013 Arana appeared in the miniseries Crimes of the German television broadcaster ZDF. In 2014, Arana appeared as a Kree ambassador in Guardians of the Galaxy.

Personal life 
Arana divides his time between Italy and Hollywood and has three sons. He is fluent in Italian as well as English, and speaks conversational French and Spanish. He is a kendo practitioner.

Filmography

Film

Television

References

External links
 

1955 births
Living people
American male film actors
American male stage actors
American male television actors
20th-century American male actors
21st-century American male actors
Male actors from San Francisco
Male actors from California
People from Auburn, California
American expatriates in Italy
City College of San Francisco alumni
American male actors of Mexican descent
Hispanic and Latino American male actors